Linda Holmes is an American author, cultural critic, and podcaster. She currently writes for NPR and hosts their podcast Pop Culture Happy Hour; Holmes also edits the Pop Culture Happy Hour blog on NPR.

Career 
While working for the Minnesota legislature, Holmes began writing about television and film in her free time for sites like Television Without Pity, Vulture.com and MSNBC. In 2007, she left her legal job and moved to New York City to dedicate her time to writing and criticism. One year later, she was hired to cover pop culture for NPR.

She currently writes for NPR and hosts their podcast Pop Culture Happy Hour with Stephen Thompson, Glen Weldon, and Aisha Harris. Holmes also edits the Pop Culture Happy Hour blog on NPR, which was originally called Monkey See.

In 2019, Holmes published her first novel, Evvie Drake Starts Over, which earned a starred Kirkus Reviews review and was selected by The Today Show as a summer book club pick. The novel tells the story of recently widowed Eveleth “Evvie” Drake and her unexpected friendship with Dean Tenney, former Major League pitcher.

Personal life 
Originally from Wilmington, Delaware, Holmes attended Oberlin College from 1989 to 1993. While there, she took a class on constitutional law that inspired her to go to law school. She enrolled at Lewis & Clark Law School in Portland, Oregon, graduating in 1997 and practicing law in Minnesota until 2007.

Works 
 Why You're Still Single. Plume, 2006. , 
 The Best of Pop Culture Happy Hour. Highbridge Co, 2015. , 
 Evvie Drake Starts Over: A Novel. Ballantine Books, 2019.  (E-book).  Hodder & Stoughton; paperback, 2020. , .
 Flying Solo: A Novel. Ballantine Books, 2022.  (hardcover).

References

External links
 
 

21st-century American women writers
American film critics
American podcasters
American television critics
American women lawyers
American lawyers
American women podcasters
Lewis & Clark College alumni
Living people
Minnesota lawyers
Novelists from Delaware
NPR personalities
Oberlin College alumni
American women film critics
Writers from Wilmington, Delaware
Year of birth missing (living people)